Ann Vickers refers to:

 Ann Vickers (novel), a 1933 novel by Sinclair Lewis
 Ann Vickers (film), a 1933 film adaption of the novel directed by John Cromwell

See Also
 Anna Vickers, a phycologist in the late 19th and early 20th century